EFLA can mean:
European Foundation for Landscape Architecture
Vesivehmaa Airport (IATA code: EFLA), Lahti, Finland
 European Forum of the National Lift Associations, predecessor of the trade association European Lift Association